Mixed Emotions was a German pop music group formed in 1986 by vocalists Drafi Deutscher (9 May 1946 – 9 June 2006) and Oliver Simon (14 May 1957 – 31 July 2013). Deutscher sang, wrote/co-wrote and produced/co-produced all Mixed Emotions' songs, many of which were co-written with regular producer and musical contributor Christopher Evans Ironside.

Their best known hit is probably that from their first year, the song "You Want Love (Maria, Maria)". Other well-known songs are "Bring Back (Sha Na Na)", "Sweetheart - Darlin' My Dear", "Just for You" and "I Never Give Up". After five best selling singles and two successful albums, the group split in 1989.

In 1991, Drafi Deutscher decided to continue with a new member, Andreas Martin, under a slightly changed name – New Mixed Emotions. The new line-up released an album called Side By Side and two singles.

In 1999, the original line-up of Drafi Deutscher and Oliver Simon reunited under the original name the Mixed Emotions for a new album called We Belong Together consisting of two new songs and 11 remakes (new music, new vocals) of their old hits. They had a number of successful TV appearances. Following this album the group disbanded again.

Drafi Deutscher died of heart failure in Frankfurt am Main on 9 June 2006. He was 60.

Oliver Simon was born in Wolfratshausen. He died of a brain tumor on 31 July 2013. He was 56.

Discography

Singles

 You Want Love (Maria, Maria) 1986]
 Bring Back (Sha Na Na) 1987
 Sweetheart – Darlin' – My Dear (Lisa My Love) 1987
 Just For You 1988
 I Never Give Up 1989
 Sensuality (When I Touch You) (as 'New Mixed Emotions') 1991
 Lonely Lover (as 'New Mixed Emotions') 1991
 You Want Love '99 1999
 Bring Back '99 1999

Albums

 Deep From The Heart 1987
 Just For You 1988
 Side By Side (as 'New Mixed Emotions') 1991
 We Belong Together 1999

Compilations

 Mixed Emotions (Best Of) (Compilation) 1990
 The Essential Drafi Deutscher / Mixed Emotions (Compilation) 2004
 My Star (Compilation) 2020

Other
"You Want Love (Maria, Maria)" was also re-recorded with Norwegian lyrics by Norwegian artist Rune Rudberg in 1988, when he released "Ut Mot Havet", his definite breakthrough song.

References

German pop music groups